The Samoan white-eye (Zosterops samoensis) is a species of bird in the family Zosteropidae. It is endemic to the island of Savai'i in Samoa.

Its natural habitats are subtropical or tropical moist montane forests and subtropical or tropical high-altitude shrubland.
It is threatened by habitat loss.

See also
Samoan tropical moist forests

References

External links
BirdLife Species Factsheet

Birds described in 1929
Birds of Samoa
Endemic fauna of Samoa
Zosterops
Taxonomy articles created by Polbot